Haydraw is an unincorporated community in Meade County, in the U.S. state of South Dakota.

History
A post office called Haydraw was established in 1910, and remained in operation until 1954. The community was named for its location within a hay-growing district.

References

Unincorporated communities in Meade County, South Dakota
Unincorporated communities in South Dakota